"The Girl in the Fireplace" is the fourth episode of the second series of the British science fiction television series Doctor Who. It was first broadcast on BBC One on 6 May 2006. Written by Steven Moffat and directed by Euros Lyn, the episode is inspired by Audrey Niffenegger's novel The Time Traveler's Wife.

The episode is set in France throughout the 18th century. In the episode, repair androids from a spaceship from the 51st century create time windows to stalk Madame de Pompadour (Sophia Myles) throughout her life. They seek to remove her brain as a replacement part for their spaceship at a particular point in her life as they believe her to be compatible with the ship.

The programme's executive producer Russell T Davies, who conceived the idea while researching for Casanova, described the episode as a love story for the show's protagonist the Tenth Doctor (David Tennant). The episode was filmed in England and Wales in October 2005. It was well received by most critics, was nominated for a Nebula Award and won the 2007 Hugo Award for Best Dramatic Presentation, Short Form.

Plot 
The Tenth Doctor, Rose, and Mickey explore a derelict spaceship in the 51st century. The Doctor looks through a time window, a doorway to another place in space and time, which is shaped like a French fireplace. He sees a young girl called Reinette on the other side of the fireplace who is in 18th-century Paris. The Doctor steps through the time window to find that months have passed. He discovers a clockwork service android disguised in 18th-century clothing hiding in Reinette's bedroom, and saves Reinette from it. Returning to Reinette's bedroom, the Doctor discovers that she is now a young woman. Reinette and the Doctor kiss before she leaves to join her mother. The Doctor realises Reinette is Madame de Pompadour, the mistress of King Louis XV. Back on the ship, the Doctor discovers a horse that stepped through a time window; he names it Arthur.

Several additional time windows are on the ship which lead to different moments in Reinette's life. The Doctor steps through one window to defend Reinette from an android. The android tells Reinette that the androids killed the ship's crew to use their organs for parts to repair the ship. The Doctor discovers that the androids plan to open a time window to Reinette's life at the age of 37, believing that her brain at that age will be compatible with the ship.

The clockwork androids appear at a costume ball in Versailles and take Reinette hostage. At one end of the room is an enormous mirror, which is actually a time window. The Doctor cannot enter the time window without being stranded in the 18th century. The androids threaten to decapitate Reinette, but the Doctor, on Arthur, crashes through the mirror to save her. With no way of returning to their ship, the androids give up and shut down. Reinette tells the Doctor that she had her fireplace moved to Versailles in the hope that he would return. The Doctor finds that the fireplace is operating and uses it to return to the spaceship. He tells Reinette to prepare to leave. The Doctor returns to Reinette, but finds that seven years have passed for her and she has died. King Louis gives the Doctor a letter in which Reinette hopes for the Doctor's quick return. The Doctor and his companions are left not knowing why the androids specifically wanted Reinette for the ship, and accept that they may never know. As they depart, the name of the ship is revealed: the SS Madame de Pompadour.

Production

Writing and characters 
In 2004, Russell T DaviesDoctor Whos executive producerwas responsible for Casanova, a serial set in the 18th century. During his research, Davies became fascinated by Madame de Pompadour and wanted to include her in a story which also involved The Turka clockwork man who played chess around the same period and which was later revealed to be a hoax. In early 2005, Steven Moffatwho had written "The Empty Child" and "The Doctor Dances" for the serieswas assigned to write the story. Euros Lyn was later assigned to direct it. Sophia Myles stated in an interview on Doctor Who Confidential that she did not have to audition for the role of Madame de Pompadour, she was offered it.

In an interview with The Independent, Davies said the episode is "practically a love story for the Doctor ... It's very understated, very beautifully done, but it's nonetheless a Time Lord falling in love and Rose's reaction to him falling in love with someone else." Moffat was inspired by Audrey Niffenegger's novel The Time Traveler's Wife, though the episode's structure is different from that of the novel. During the production, Moffat considered "Madame de Pompadour", "Every Tick of My Heart", "Reinette and the Lonely Angel" and "Loose Connection" for the episode's title. "The Girl in the Fireplace" was planned as the second episode of the 2006 series, but when Davies realised how experimental it had become in Moffat's hands, he decided to move it to fourth in the running order between "School Reunion" and "Rise of the Cybermen".

While Moffat was creating the clockwork automata he first decided to hide their faces with wigs, but when producer Phil Collinson told him this would severely limit camera angles, and that it could appear comical, the androids were given carnival masks to wear. Neill Gorton of Millennium Effects designed the androids and they were constructed by Richard Darwen and Gustav Hoegan.

While the episode appears to follow immediately from the previous episode "School Reunion", Moffat says in the DVD audio commentary that when he wrote "The Girl in the Fireplace" he had not yet read the end of "School Reunion", hence the lack of Rose's continuing animosity shown towards Mickey after he joins the TARDIS crew. After reading the Doctor's mind, Reinette says "Doctor who?", a reference both to the series' title and to the long-running mystery about the Doctor's actual name. She also says that it is "more than just a secret", but does not elaborate further. Moffat said that he added the dialogue because he believes that because the Doctor does not tell even his closest companions his name, there must be a "dreadful secret" about it. Moffat also says that he did not include the word "Torchwood" (an "arc word" in the second series) in the script because Davies did not ask him to do so.

Filming 
Filming for the episode took place between 12 and 27 October 2005. The scenes set in Versailles were filmed elsewhere; the first scenes filmed in which Reinette's body is taken away were filmed at Culverhouse Cross in Cardiff, Madame de Pompadour's sitting room and bedroom scenes were filmed at Tredegar Housea 17th-century mansion in Newport, Dyffryn Gardens in the Vale of Glamorgan was used as the set for the palace gardens, and Ragley Hall near Alcester was used for the ballroom scenes. The scenes on the spaceship, which were shot by the second unit, were also filmed in Newport.

Two horses were used in the episode; one was used for the scenes in close quarters on the spaceship, and another for jumps. According to Doctor Who Confidential, the horse was not allowed into the ballroom for the climactic scene. Thus, the elements of the Doctor riding through the mirror, the horse, the mirror breaking and the reactions of the extras in the ballroom had to be filmed separately and then composited together with chroma key.  Tennant's head was superimposed upon that of the stunt rider in post-production. Initially, the programme's staff considered the use of special effects but realised this would be very expensive and rejected the idea.

Broadcast and reception
"The Girl in the Fireplace" was first broadcast in the United Kingdom on BBC One on 6 May 2006. The final rating for the episode was 7.90 million, making it the thirteenth most watched programme on British television that week. It received an Appreciation Index of 84, considered "excellent". The episode's script was nominated for the 2006 Nebula Award, and "The Girl in the Fireplace" won the 2007 Hugo Award for Best Dramatic Presentation, Short Form.

Writing for IGN, Ahsan Haque praised Tennant and Myles' acting, the episode's pacing and the "extremely touching" story. He wrote that "with a little more attention to temporal details, this episode would have been considered as one of the series' greatest moments". In particular, Haque wrote that the episode would have worked better had the writers explained more precisely why the Doctor could not use the TARDIS to visit Madame de Pompadour before she died. Metro said the clockwork androids were one of the "most memorable villains" while The Guardians Daniel Martin said "The Girl in the Fireplace" is "one of the most acclaimed episodes from the Davies era".

Ross Ruediger from Slant Magazine wrote that the episode "may be the crowning achievement" of Doctor Whos second series. Ruediger called it an episode "for the new millennium" as he thought it "could never exist under the banner of the old series." He called it a "thought-provoking piece", and wrote that episodes like this could not be broadcast every week since it "would be too taxing on the average viewer's brain". IGN's Matt Wales ranked "The Girl in the Fireplace" the third best Tennant Doctor Who story, calling it "one of Doctor Whos most touching adventures".

Not all reviews were positive, however. In the book The Doctors Are In, co-author Robert Smith stated that he was critical of the Doctor and Reinette's relationship, finding it awkward, especially due to the Doctor first meeting her as a child. He criticises the dialogue and characterisation – questioning, for example, Rose's small role and her lack of upset at the Doctor leaving her for Reinette. Although he praises "The Girl in the Fireplace"'s cast, Smith describes the overall episode as "criminal" for Rose.

See also 
 Clockpunk
 Moberly–Jourdain incident, a supposed real life incident of time travel at Versailles.

References

External links 

 TARDISODE 4
 Episode trailer
 Episode commentary by Phil Collinson, Helen Raynor and Eugene Washington (MP3)
 "The Girl in the Fireplace" episode homepage
 

Hugo Award for Best Dramatic Presentation, Short Form-winning works
Tenth Doctor episodes
Doctor Who pseudohistorical serials
2006 British television episodes
Television episodes about androids
Paris in fiction
Steampunk television episodes
Television episodes written by Steven Moffat
Fiction set in 1727
Fiction set in 1758
Fiction set in the 1760s
Fiction set in the 6th millennium
Cultural depictions of Madame de Pompadour
Television episodes set in Paris
Television episodes set in the 18th century
Television episodes set in outer space